IISU may refer to:

 ISRO Inertial Systems Unit (IISU), a unit of the Indian Space Research Organisation 
 iisu, the gesture recognition software platform by Softkinetic